Roy Francis Beiber (1901-1955) was an Australian rugby league footballer who played in the 1920s.

Playing career
Former teenage Sydney boxer, Roy Beiber (or Bieber) was a South Sydney junior who came to the St. George club for one season in 1922. He re-joined South Sydney in 1924 and stayed for three seasons before retiring. 

Roy Beiber won a Reserve Grade premiership with the South Sydney Rabbitohs on 18 Sep 1926.

Death
Beiber died on 21 May 1955.

References

1901 births
1955 deaths
St. George Dragons players
South Sydney Rabbitohs players
Australian rugby league players
Rugby league players from Sydney
Rugby league props
Rugby league second-rows